Alyavy is a rural locality (a khutor) and the administrative center of Alyavskoye Rural Settlement, Yelansky District, Volgograd Oblast, Russia. The population was 259 as of 2010.

Geography 
Alyavy is located on Khopyorsko-Buzulukskaya Plain, 48 km south of Yelan (the district's administrative centre) by road. Zelyony is the nearest rural locality.

References 

Rural localities in Yelansky District